Grevillea prominens is a species of flowering plant in the family Proteaceae and is endemic to a restricted part of the South West region of Western Australia. It is a shrub with divided leaves, the end-lobes linear to narrow triangular, and creamy-white flowers usually projected beyond the foliage.

Description

TaxonomyGrevillea prominens was first formally described in 1993 by Peter Olde and Neil Marriott in the journal Nuytsia from specimens collected near Harvey in 1991. The specific epithet (prominens) means "prominent", referring to the flowers held conspiculusly above the foliage.

Distribution and habitat
This grevillea grows in forest along creek lines and is only known from a few locations near Harvey in the Jarrah Forest bioregion of south-western Western Australia.

Conservation statusGrevillea prominens'' is listed as  "Priority Three" by the Government of Western Australia Department of Biodiversity, Conservation and Attractions, meaning that it is poorly known and known from only a few locations but is not under imminent threat.

See also
 List of Grevillea species

References

prominens
Proteales of Australia
Eudicots of Western Australia
Endemic flora of Western Australia
Plants described in 1993